The Visa-Bikar 2000 was the forty-first season of the Icelandic national football cup.

Third round

| colspan="3" style="background:#9cc;"|June 13, 2000

|-
| colspan="3" style="background:#9cc;"|June 14, 2000

|-
| colspan="3" style="background:#9cc;"|June 15, 2000

|}

Fourth round

| colspan="3" style="background:#9cc;"|July 3, 2000

|-
| colspan="3" style="background:#9cc;"|July 4, 2000

|-
| colspan="3" style="background:#9cc;"|July 5, 2000

|}

Quarterfinals

Semifinals

Final

External links
 RSSSF Page

2000 domestic association football cups
2000 in Icelandic football
2000